Brahmapuri  is a village development committee in Rautahat District in the Narayani Zone of south-eastern Nepal, near the India–Nepal border. At the time of the 1991 Nepal census it had a population of 4014.

References

 

Populated places in Rautahat District